The William Gray House (also known as the G. H. Simpson House) is a historic house located at 407 Washington Street in La Grange, Lewis County, Missouri.

Description and history 
It was built in about 1860, and is a two-story, three bay wide, side hall plan, brick I-house with Greek Revival style design elements. It has a long one-story brick rear ell and a one-story front porch that surrounds the main entrance.

It was listed on the National Register of Historic Places on June 3, 1999.

References

Houses on the National Register of Historic Places in Missouri
Greek Revival houses in Missouri
Houses completed in 1860
Buildings and structures in Lewis County, Missouri
National Register of Historic Places in Lewis County, Missouri
1860 establishments in Missouri
I-houses in Missouri